Zero is the eleventh single by B'z, released on October 7, 1992, and the only one from their album Run. This song is one of B'z many number-one singles in Oricon chart, selling over 600,000 copies in its first week, although there was no tie up for the song at that moment. The single was re-released in 2003, and re-entered at #4. It sold over 1,310,000 copies according to Oricon.

Track listing 
Zero
Koi-gokoro

Certifications

References

External links
B'z official website

1992 singles
B'z songs
Oricon Weekly number-one singles
Songs written by Tak Matsumoto
Songs written by Koshi Inaba
BMG Japan singles
1992 songs